Toksook Bay  is a city and village on Nelson Island in Bethel Census Area, Alaska. The population was 590 at the 2010 census, up from 532 in 2000. As of 2018, the estimated population was 667, making it the largest village on the island.

Toksook Bay (pronounced  in Yup'ik) was established in 1964 by residents of nearby Nightmute.  is its ‘real name’. Almost the entire population are members of the Alaska Native Nunakauyarmiut ("People of Nunakauyaq"), who rely on fishing and other subsistence activities.

History
The community was chosen as the site of first enumeration of the 2020 U.S. Census, due to the remoteness of the Alaskan Bush and the necessity of collecting census data early from remote sites. The enumeration started on January 21, 2020.

Demographics

Toksook Bay first appeared on the 1970 U.S. Census as an unincorporated village. It formally incorporated in 1972.

As of the census of 2000, there were 532 people, 106 households, and 94 families residing in the city.  The population density was 16.1 people per square mile (6.2/km2).  There were 110 housing units at an average density of 3.3 per square mile (1.3/km2).  The racial makeup of the city was 2.44% White, 94.36% Native American, and 3.20% from two or more races.

There were 106 households, out of which 68.9% had children under the age of 18 living with them, 65.1% were married couples living together, 12.3% had a female householder with no husband present, and 11.3% were non-families. Of all households 10.4% were made up of individuals, and 0.9% had someone living alone who was 65 years of age or older.  The average household size was 5.02 and the average family size was 5.45.

In the city, the age distribution of the population shows 44.0% under the age of 18, 9.8% from 18 to 24, 27.4% from 25 to 44, 14.1% from 45 to 64, and 4.7% who were 65 years of age or older.  The median age was 22 years. For every 100 females, there were 118.0 males.  For every 100 females age 18 and over, there were 124.1 males.

The median income for a household in the city was $30,208, and the median income for a family was $32,188. Males had a median income of $22,813 versus $36,250 for females. The per capita income for the city was $8,761.  About 26.9% of families and 27.3% of the population were below the poverty line, including 37.4% of those under age 18 and 28.6% of those age 65 or over.

Education
The Lower Kuskokwim School District operates Nelson Island School, K–12.

References

Further reading
 Brad Reynolds SJ and Don Doll SJ (photographs; June 1984): "Eskimo Hunters of the Bering Sea", National Geographic, Vol. 165. No. 6, pp. 814–834

1964 establishments in Alaska
Cities in Alaska
Cities in Bethel Census Area, Alaska
Populated coastal places in Alaska on the Pacific Ocean
Populated places established in 1964